The Abara River, also known as Abara Khawr, is a stream in Jonglei, South Sudan. It is a tributary of the Agwei River. The Abara meets the Kongkong River to form the Agwei just east of Bongak. The stream is a wadi, or ravine, that may run dry during the dry season but quickly becomes a watercourse due to heavy rainfall during the wet season.

References 

Rivers of South Sudan
Jonglei State
Greater Upper Nile
Nile basin